Captain Jack Sparrow is a fictional character and the main protagonist of the Pirates of the Caribbean film series. The character was created by screenwriters Ted Elliott and Terry Rossio and is portrayed by Johnny Depp. 

The characterization of Sparrow is based on a combination of The Rolling Stones' guitarist Keith Richards and Looney Tunes cartoons, specifically the characters Bugs Bunny and Pepé Le Pew. He first appears in the 2003 film Pirates of the Caribbean: The Curse of the Black Pearl. He later appears in the sequels Dead Man's Chest (2006), At World's End (2007), On Stranger Tides (2011), and Dead Men Tell No Tales (2017).

In the films, Sparrow is one of the nine pirate lords in the Brethren Court, the Pirate Lords of the Seven Seas. He can be treacherous and survives mostly by using wit and negotiation rather than by force, opting to flee most dangerous situations and to fight only when necessary. 

Sparrow is introduced seeking to regain his ship, the Black Pearl, from his mutinous first mate, Hector Barbossa. Later, he attempts to escape his blood debt to the legendary Davy Jones while fighting the East India Trading Company. In later adventures he searches for the Fountain of Youth and the Trident of Poseidon.

The Pirates of the Caribbean series was inspired by the Disney theme park ride of the same name, and when the ride was revamped in 2006, the character of Captain Jack Sparrow was added to it. He headlined the Legend of Captain Jack Sparrow attraction at Disney's Hollywood Studios, and is the subject of spin-off novels, including a children's book series, Pirates of the Caribbean: Jack Sparrow, which chronicles his childhood years.

Concept and creation

Characters
When writing the screenplay for The Curse of the Black Pearl, Ted Elliott and Terry Rossio envisioned Captain Jack Sparrow as a supporting character in the vein of Bugs Bunny and Groucho Marx. The producers saw him as a young Burt Lancaster. Director Gore Verbinski admitted, "The first film was a movie, and then Jack was put into it almost. He doesn't have the obligations of the plot in the same ways that the other characters have. He meanders his way through, and he kind of affects everybody else." Sparrow represents an ethical pirate, with Captain Barbossa as his corrupt foil, though both characters viewed as both light and dark tricksters. His true motives usually remain masked, and whether he is honorable or evil depends on the audience's perspective. This acts as part of Will Turner's arc, in which Sparrow tells him a pirate can be a good man, like his father.

Following the success of The Curse of the Black Pearl, the challenge to creating a sequel was, according to Verbinski, "You don't want just the Jack Sparrow movie. It's like having a garlic milkshake. He's the spice and you need a lot of straight men ... Let's not give them too much Jack. It's like too much dessert or too much of a good thing." Although Dead Man's Chest was written to propel the trilogy's plot, Sparrow's state-of-mind as he is pursued by Davy Jones becomes increasingly edgy, and the writers concocted the cannibal sequence to show that he was in danger whether on land or at sea. Sparrow is perplexed over his attraction to Elizabeth Swann, and attempts to justify it throughout the film.

At World's End was meant to return it tonally to a character piece. Sparrow, in particular, is tinged with madness after extended solitary confinement in Davy Jones's Locker, and now desires immortality. Sparrow struggles with what it takes to be a moral person, after his honest streak caused his doom in the second film. This is mainly shown by his increasingly erratic behaviour and Jack's hallucinations, which appeared to be simply his deranged mind in the beginning where dozens of "Jack Sparrows" appeared to crew the ship in his solitary exile, but later the hallucinations grew more important and there were mainly two "Jacks" constantly arguing about which path to follow: the immortality or the mortality. The last hallucination took place while Jack was imprisoned on the Dutchman, where his honest streak won. By the end of At World's End, Sparrow is sailing to the Fountain of Youth, an early concept for the second film. Rossio said in 2007 that a fourth film was possible, and producer Jerry Bruckheimer expressed interest in a spin-off. Gore Verbinski concurred that "all of the stories set in motion by the first film have been resolved. If there ever were another Pirates of the Caribbean film, I would start fresh and focus on the further adventures of Captain Jack Sparrow."

On Stranger Tides was first announced on September 28, 2008, during a Disney event at the Kodak Theatre. Verbinski did not return to direct the fourth installment and was replaced by Rob Marshall. The movie uses elements from Tim Powers' novel of the same name, particularly Blackbeard and the Fountain of Youth, but the film is not a straight adaptation of the novel.

The fifth film, Dead Men Tell No Tales, was co-directed by Joachim Rønning and Espen Sandberg.

Johnny Depp

Looking to do a family film, Johnny Depp visited the Walt Disney Studios in 2001 when he heard of plans to adapt the Pirates of the Caribbean ride into a film. Depp was excited by the possibility of reviving an old Hollywood genre, and found the script met his quirky sensibilities: the crew of the Black Pearl were not in search of treasure but trying to return it to lift a curse on them, and the traditional mutiny had already occurred. Depp was cast on June 10, 2002. Producer Jerry Bruckheimer felt Depp would give the film an edge that could draw teenage and adult audiences despite Disney's reputation for soft children's fare.

According to various reports and interviews, Johnny Depp prepared for the role while rehearsing in the steam room of a sauna. At times, he claimed to turn the heat up to its max temperature of 1,000 degrees. The actor was quoted as saying, "Captain Jack was actually born in a sauna—my sauna. I figured this is a guy who has been on the high seas for probably all of his life, the majority of his life at least, and therefore probably dealt with a lot of inescapable heat to the brain." Depp also said, due to his daughter Lily-Rose Depp being three years old at the time, he watched various cartoons, using Tex Avery and Wile E. Coyote as examples.

At the first read-through, Depp surprised the cast and crew by portraying the character in an off-kilter manner. He researched 18th-century pirates and, seeing parallels with modern rock stars, modeled his performance on Keith Richards. Richards later appeared in two cameos as Jack's father, Captain Teague, in At World's End and On Stranger Tides. Verbinski and Bruckheimer had confidence in Depp, partly because Orlando Bloom would play the traditional Errol Flynn-type character. Depp improvised the film's final line, "Now, bring me that horizon", which the writer called his favorite line. Disney executives were initially confused by Depp's performance, questioning whether the character was drunk or gay. While watching the rushes, Disney CEO Michael Eisner proclaimed Depp was ruining the film. Depp's response to Disney executives was they could trust him with his choices or let him go. Many industry insiders questioned Depp's casting, as he was an unconventional actor not known for working within the traditional studio system.

Depp's performance won acclaim from film critics. Alan Morrison found it "Gloriously over-the-top ... In terms of physical precision and verbal delivery, it's a master-class in comedy acting." Roger Ebert praised Depp for drawing away from the character as written and found Depp's performance "original in its every atom. There has never been a pirate, or for that matter a human being, like this in any other movie ... his behavior shows a lifetime of rehearsal". Depp won a Screen Actor's Guild award for his performance, and was nominated for a Golden Globe and the Academy Award for Best Actor, the first in his career. Film School Rejects argued the film made Depp as much a movie star as he was a character actor.

Depp's return in Dead Man's Chest was the first time he had ever made a sequel. Drew McWeeny wrote, "Remember how cool Han Solo was in Star Wars the first time you saw it? And then remember how much cooler he seemed when Empire came out? This is that big a jump."  Depp received an MTV Movie Award and a Teen Choice Award for Dead Man's Chest, and was nominated for an Empire Award and another Golden Globe. For his performance in At World's End, Depp won an MTV Movie Award for Best Comedic Performance, as well as a People's Choice Award, a Kids' Choice Award, and another Teen Choice Award. He has signed on to reprise the role for future sequels.

Make-up and costumes

Depp wears a dreadlock wig in a rock-and-roll approach to a pirate aesthetic. He wears a red bandanna and numerous objects in his hair, influenced by Keith Richards' habit of collecting souvenirs from his travels; Sparrow's decorations include his "piece of eight". Sparrow wears kohl around his eyes, which was inspired by Depp's study of nomads, whom he compared to pirates, and he wore contacts that acted as sunglasses. Sparrow has several gold teeth, two of which belong to Depp, although they were applied during filming. Depp initially forgot to have them removed after shooting The Curse of the Black Pearl, and wore them throughout the shooting of the sequels. Like all aspects of Depp's performance, Disney initially expressed great concern over Depp's teeth. Sparrow wears his goatee in two braids. Initially wire was used in them, but the wires were abandoned because they made the braids stick up when Depp lay down. Sparrow has numerous tattoos, and has been branded a pirate on his right arm by Cutler Beckett, underneath a tattoo of a sparrow.

Depp collaborated with costume designer Penny Rose on his character's appearance, handpicking a tricorne as Sparrow's signature leather hat; to make Sparrow's unique, the other characters did not wear leather hats. A rubber version was used for the scene in Dead Man's Chest when the hat floats on water. Depp liked to stick to one costume, wearing one lightweight silk tweed frock coat throughout the series, and he had to be coaxed out of wearing his boots for a version without a sole or heel in beach scenes. The official line is that none of the costumes from The Curse of the Black Pearl survived, which allowed the opportunity to create tougher linen shirts for stunts. However, one remains which has been displayed in an exhibition of screen costumes in Worcester, England. It was a nightmare for Rose to track down the same makers of Sparrow's sash in Turkey. Rose did not want to silkscreen it, as the homewoven piece had the correct worn feel. Sparrow wears an additional belt in the sequels, because Depp liked a new buckle which did not fit with the original piece.

Sparrow's weapons are genuine 18th-century pieces: his sword dates to the 1740s and his pistol is from the 1760s. Both were made in London. Depp used two pistols on set, one of rubber. Both survived production of the first film. Sparrow's magic compass also survived into the sequels, though director Gore Verbinski had a red arrow added to the dial as it became a more prominent prop. As it does not act like a normal compass, a magnet was used to make it spin. Sparrow wears four rings, two of which belong to Depp. Depp bought the green ring in 1989 and the gold ring is a replica of a 2400-year-old ring Depp gave to the crew, though the original was later stolen. The other two are props to which Depp gave backstories: the gold-and-black ring is stolen from a Spanish widow Sparrow seduced and the green dragon ring recalls his adventures in the Far East. Among Depp's additional ideas was the necklace made of human toes that Sparrow wears as the Pelegosto prepare to eat him, and the sceptre was based on one a friend of Depp's owned.

During the course of the trilogy, Sparrow undergoes physical transformations. In The Curse of the Black Pearl, Sparrow curses himself to battle the undead Barbossa. Like all the actors playing the Black Pearl crew, Depp had to shoot scenes in costume as a reference for the animators, and his shots as a skeleton were shot again without him. Depp reprised the scene again on a motion capture stage. In At World's End, Sparrow hallucinates a version of himself as a member of Davy Jones's crew, adhered to a wall and encrusted with barnacles. Verbinski oversaw that the design retained Sparrow's distinctive look, and rejected initial designs which portrayed him as over 100 years old.

Films

The Curse of the Black Pearl

Captain Jack Sparrow first appears in The Curse of the Black Pearl (2003).

In his debut scene, Sparrow arrives in Port Royal, Jamaica on a sinking boat, seeking to commandeer a new ship. Despite rescuing Elizabeth Swann,  the daughter of Governor Weatherby Swann, from drowning, he is jailed for piracy. That night, a cursed pirate ship called the Black Pearl attacks Port Royal and Elizabeth is kidnapped. The Black Pearls captain, Hector Barbossa, desperately seeks one last gold coin to break an ancient Aztec curse that he and his crew are under. A blacksmith named Will Turner frees Sparrow to aid him in rescuing Elizabeth. They commandeer HMS Interceptor and recruit a motley crew in Tortuga, Haiti before heading to Isla de Muerta, where Elizabeth is held captive. Along the way, Will learns that Sparrow was the Black Pearls original captain until Barbossa led a mutiny ten years earlier and took over the ship, marooning Sparrow on an island to die. Sparrow tells Turner that his father was a pirate known as "Bootstrap" Bill Turner.

The rescue attempt goes awry and Barbossa maroons Jack and Elizabeth on the same island upon which he had stranded Sparrow before. Elizabeth creates a signal fire from rum barrels  and they are rescued by the Royal Navy. Sparrow cuts a deal with Commodore James Norrington to lead Norrington to the Black Pearl. Norrington refuses until Elizabeth, desperate to save Will, spontaneously accepts Norrington's earlier marriage proposal. Right before the film's climactic battle with the pirates at Isla de Muerta, Sparrow swipes a cursed coin from the treasure chest, making himself immortal and capable of dueling Barbossa. He shoots his nemesis with the pistol he has carried for ten years just as Will breaks the curse, killing Barbossa. Despite having assisted the Navy, Sparrow is sentenced to hang.

At Sparrow's execution in Port Royal, Will saves Sparrow, but they are quickly captured. Elizabeth intervenes, declaring her love for Will who is pardoned, while Sparrow escapes by tumbling off a sea wall. The Black Pearl and her new crew arrive in time to retrieve him, and he becomes captain once more. Impressed by the wily pirate, Norrington allows him one day's head start before giving chase.

Dead Man's Chest

A year following the events of the first film, Sparrow searches for the Dead Man's Chest, which contains the heart of Davy Jones.  Sparrow made a bargain with Jones to raise the sunken Black Pearl and make Sparrow captain for thirteen years. Now the debt is due, and Sparrow must either serve one hundred years aboard the Flying Dutchman, or be dragged to Davy Jones's Locker by the Kraken. If he can find the Dead Man's Chest, Sparrow can free his soul and control Jones and the seas.

Adding to Sparrow's woes, Lord Cutler Beckett of the East India Trading Company has a personal score to settle with Sparrow. Beckett wants the chest and forces Will Turner to search for Sparrow and his magic compass. Turner locates Sparrow and his crew on Pelegosto, held captive by cannibals who intend to eat Sparrow. They escape, and voyage to Tia Dalma (a magical woman later revealed to be the Goddess, Calypso, bound in human form as Dalma, and former lover of Jones). Dalma immediately sees destiny in Will, and provides Sparrow with a jar of dirt – Jones can only set foot on land once every 10 years, and since land is where Sparrow is safe, Dalma suggests with the dirt that he takes land with him.

Sparrow strikes a new deal with Jones to deliver one hundred souls in exchange for his own. Jones agrees but keeps Turner as a "good faith payment". Sparrow is recruiting sailors in Tortuga when he encounters Elizabeth Swann and James Norrington, the latter having succumbed to alcohol. Sparrow convinces Elizabeth that Turner can be freed by using the magic compass to find the chest. The duo head for Isla Cruces and find Will, who escaped Jones's ship and has stolen the key to the Chest. Turner wants to stab Jones's heart and free his father from Jones's servitude, while Norrington plots to restore his career by delivering the heart to Beckett. Sparrow wants it to convince Jones to call off the Kraken.

Norrington escapes with the heart amid a battle with Jones's crew, and Jones summons the Kraken. Realizing Sparrow is the target, Elizabeth traps him aboard the Black Pearl as the crew abandons the ship, and kisses him while she handcuffs him to the mast. Then, the monster devours Sparrow and drags the ship and his soul to Davy Jones's Locker. The surviving crew seeks refuge with Tia Dalma who produces a captain she says can rescue Sparrow: a resurrected Hector Barbossa.

At World's End

Two months following the events of the second film, with Davy Jones's heart in his possession and the Flying Dutchman under his command, Cutler Beckett begins exterminating all pirates. To combat Beckett, the nine pirate lords of the Brethren Court convene at Shipwreck Cove. Only Jack Sparrow is missing, killed and sent to Davy Jones's Locker at the end of the previous film. Sparrow, as Pirate Lord of the Caribbean, must attend, as he did not bequeath to a designated heir his "piece of eight", a pirate lord's marker. The collective "nine pieces of eight" are needed to free sea goddess Calypso to defeat Beckett. With Elizabeth and Will, Barbossa leads Sparrow's crew to Davy Jones's Locker using stolen navigational charts from the pirate lord Sao Feng. After the crew locate him, Sparrow deciphers a clue on the charts allowing them to escape the Locker.

At the Brethren Court, Elizabeth has succeeded Captain Sao Feng as a Pirate Lord and is elected "Pirate King" after Sparrow breaks a stalemate vote. Sparrow is briefly reunited with his father, Captain Teague. During a parley with Beckett and Jones, Sparrow is traded for Turner, whom Jones and Beckett had captured. The Black Pearl battles the Flying Dutchman during a maelstrom created by Calypso, during which Sparrow steals Jones's heart to become immortal. When Jones mortally wounds Turner, Sparrow instead chooses to save Turner by helping him stab the heart, which kills Jones and makes Turner the Dutchmans captain. Together, the Pearl and the Dutchman destroy Beckett's ship. At the end, Barbossa again commandeers the Pearl and Sao Feng's charts, stranding Sparrow and Gibbs in Tortuga.  However, Sparrow had managed to cut out the navigational section of the charts and with them begins to search for the legendary Fountain of Youth.

On Stranger Tides

After failing to find the Fountain of Youth, Sparrow arrives in London only to learn someone is gathering a crew by using his name. While searching for the imposter, he saves Gibbs from being hanged but is captured by the Royal Guards. They present him to King George II. Sparrow is surprised to learn Captain Barbossa is now a privateer in the Royal Navy. Sparrow refuses to negotiate with them to locate the Fountain of Youth and escapes. Soon he crosses paths with his impersonator, an old flame named Angelica. She shanghais him to serve aboard the Queen Anne's Revenge, the ship captained by her father Blackbeard, who forces Sparrow to search for the Fountain of Youth.

Sparrow fails in his attempt to take over the ship in a mutiny against Blackbeard and save the naive Angelica from her evil father. After encountering dangerous mermaids, Barbossa, and the Spanish Navy, Sparrow locates the Fountain of Youth.  When Angelica is mortally wounded, he tricks Blackbeard into sacrificing himself to save her, and Angelica blames Sparrow for her father's death. Sparrow and Angelica acknowledge their feelings for one another, but Sparrow maroons Angelica on an island, deeming her untrustworthy and dangerous. Gibbs, meanwhile, has retrieved the shrunken Black Pearl from Blackbeard's collection of shrunken ships in the hope of restoring it to normal size. Though he has forfeited his opportunity for immortality, Sparrow settles for being famous as the one who found the Fountain of Youth. Following the film's end credits, Angelica's voodoo doll of Sparrow has drifted to the island that she is marooned on.

Dead Men Tell No Tales

Some time after the quest for the Fountain of Youth, Jack has reassembled a small crew, but the Black Pearl is still trapped in a bottle, his new ship the Dying Gull has never left berth, and his latest plans have met with failure. Meanwhile, his rival Barbossa has become the richest and most powerful pirate of the seven seas.

Sparrow and his crew attempt to rob the new bank of St. Martin. The robbery is a success, but all the gold in it had fallen while they were dragging the locker, and Sparrow's crew abandons him. Despondent, Jack trades his magical compass for a drink. However, this betrayal of the compass releases an old enemy of Sparrow, who holds a serious grudge against him; the ruthless undead pirate hunter Captain Salazar. Years previously, Jack had defeated Salazar by tricking him into sailing his ship into the Devil's Triangle, where Salazar and his crew were cursed to live as the undead. Salazar states that Jack perched in the ship's rigging like a "little bird", earning him the name "Jack the Sparrow". It was during this event that Jack received his compass, as well as his characteristic gear.

While in prison, Jack is contacted by Henry Turner, the son of Will and Elizabeth, to seek his aid in finding the Trident of Poseidon. Remembering Elizabeth and Will from his previous misadventures, Jack agrees but not before expressing some hesitation. The next day, Sparrow is sentenced to be executed by guillotine (by Jack's accidental choosing), but is rescued by Henry and his crew. Aided by aspiring astronomer Carina, Jack and Henry attempt to locate the Trident of Poseidon, as both are in need of its power to break curses related to the sea. Barbossa releases the Pearl from its bottle, giving them a chance to outrun Salazar. Jack and Barbossa discuss the fact that Carina is in truth Barbossa's long-lost daughter, whom he had left at an orphanage in order to give her a chance for a better life. Jack attempts to use the secret to blackmail Barbossa, but fails.

They are able to track the Trident to its resting place. Though Salazar nearly kills Jack, they are able to destroy the Trident. With the destruction of the Trident, Salazar and his crew become mortal again. Jack, Henry and Carina escape as Barbossa sacrifices himself to kill Salazar. Despite their differences, Jack mourns Barbossa's death. Later, Jack watches Will and Elizabeth's reunion before he departs, the Black Pearl and his compass once again in his possession.

Characterization
According to screenwriters Ted Elliott and Terry Rossio, Sparrow is a trickster who uses wit and deceit to attain his goals, preferring to end disputes verbally instead of by force. He walks with a slightly drunken swagger and has slurred speech and flailing hand gestures. Sparrow is shrewd, calculating, and eccentric. He fools Norrington and his crew to set sail on the royal ship Interceptor, which compels the admiration of Lieutenant Groves as he concedes: "That's got to be the best pirate I have ever seen". Norrington himself acquiesces to this praise: "So it would seem", in sharp contrast to what he had previously proclaimed: "You are without doubt the worst pirate I have ever heard of". In the third film, while he leaves Beckett's ship stranded and makes off, Lieutenant Groves asks him: "Do you think he plans it all out, or just makes it up as he goes along?"

Though a skilled swordsman, Sparrow prefers to use his superior intelligence during combat, exploiting his environment to turn the tables on his foes, reasoning "Why fight when you can negotiate?" He uses strategies of non-violent negotiation and turning his enemies against each other. He invokes parleys and tempts his enemies away from their murderous intentions, encouraging them to see the bigger picture, as he does when he persuades Barbossa to delay returning to mortal form so he can battle the Royal Navy. He often uses complex wordplay and vocabulary to confound his enemies, and it is suggested that his pacifism may be one reason Barbossa and the crew of the Black Pearl mutinied.

The character is portrayed as having created, or at least contributed to, his own reputation. When Gibbs tells Will that Sparrow escaped from a desert island by strapping two sea turtles together, Sparrow embellishes the story by claiming the rope was made from hair from his own back, while in reality, Sparrow escaped the island by bartering with rum traders. The video game Pirates of the Caribbean: The Legend of Jack Sparrow bases itself on these tall tales, including the sacking of Nassau port without firing a shot. Depp has likened pirates to rock stars in that their fame preceded them. Sparrow insists on being addressed as "Captain" and often gives the farewell, "This is the day you will always remember as the day that you almost caught Captain Jack Sparrow!" which is sometimes humorously cut off. When Norrington accuses him of being the worst pirate he has ever heard of, Sparrow replies, "But you have heard of me." In a deleted scene from The Curse of the Black Pearl Sparrow ponders being "the immortal Captain Jack Sparrow", and during At World's End he again is interested in immortality, although his father, Captain Teague, warns it can be a terrible curse. Sparrow ponders being "Captain Jack Sparrow, the last pirate," as the East India Trading Company purges piracy. The topic of immortality is brought up again during On Stranger Tides, when Jack says "But better to not know which moment may be your last,every mortal of your entire being alive to the infinite mystery of it all".

Despite his many heroics, Sparrow is a pirate and a morally ambiguous character. When agreeing to trade 100 souls, including Will, to Davy Jones in exchange for his freedom, Jones asks Sparrow whether he can, "condemn an innocent man—a friend—to a lifetime of servitude in your name while you roam free?" After a hesitation Sparrow merrily replies, "Yep! I'm good with it!" He carelessly runs up debts with Anamaria, Davy Jones, and the other pirate lords. Sao Feng, pirate lord of Singapore, is particularly hateful towards him. In a cowardly moment, Sparrow abandons his crew during the Kraken's attack, but underlying loyalty and morality compel him to return and save them. Sparrow claims to be a man of his word, and expresses surprise that people doubt his truthfulness; there is no murder on his criminal record.

Depp partly based the character on Pepé Le Pew, a womanizing skunk from Looney Tunes. Sparrow claims to have a "tremendous intuitive sense of the female creature," although his conquests are often left with a sour memory of him. Former flames, Scarlett and Giselle, usually slap him or anyone looking for him. His witty charm easily attracts women, and even has Elizabeth questioning her feelings. Verbinski noted phallic connotations in Sparrow's relationship with his vessel, as he grips the ship's wheel. The Black Pearl is described as "the only ship which can outrun the Flying Dutchman". The Freudian overtones continue in the third film when Sparrow and Barbossa battle for captaincy of the Black Pearl, showing off the length of their telescopes, and in a deleted scene, they fight over the steering wheel. Sparrow claims his "first and only love is the sea," and describes his ship as representing freedom. Davy Jones's Locker is represented as a desert, symbolizing his personal hell.

According to writer Giles Milton, Jack Sparrow was inspired by the seventeenth-century English pirate Jack Ward.

Reception and impact on pop culture
 
When Dead Man's Chest grossed over  worldwide, Ian Nathan attributed this to Sparrow's popularity: "Pirates, the franchise, only had to turn up. There was a powerful holdover from the cheeky delights of its debut, something we hadn't felt since the Clone Wars called it a day." Empire in 2006 declared Depp's performance the seventy-fourth "thing that rocked our world" and later named him the eighth greatest movie character of all time. In 2015, a new poll of the 100 greatest film characters of all time placed him as the fourteenth greatest. A survey of more than 3,000 people showed Jack Sparrow was the most popular Halloween costume of 2006, and a 2007 poll held by the Internet Movie Database showed Sparrow to be the second most popular live action hero after Indiana Jones. In a 2007 Pearl & Dean poll, Jack Sparrow was listed as Depp's most popular performance.

Todd Gilchrist feels Sparrow is the only element of the films that will remain timeless. According to Sharon Eberson, the character's popularity can be attributed to his being a "scoundrel whose occasional bouts of conscience allow viewers to go with the flaws because, as played to the larger-than-life hilt by Depp, he owns every scene he is in". Film history professor Jonathan Kuntz attributed Sparrow's popularity to the increased questioning of masculinity in the 21st century, and Sparrow's personality contrasts with action-adventure heroes in cinema. Leonard Maltin concurs that Sparrow has a carefree attitude and does not take himself seriously. Mark Fox noted Sparrow is an escapist fantasy figure for women, free from much of the responsibility of most heroes. Sparrow is listed by IGN as one of their ten favorite film outlaws, as he "lives for himself and the freedom to do whatever it is that he damn well pleases. Precious few film characters have epitomized what makes the outlaw such a romantic figure for audiences as Captain Jack Sparrow has." Entertainment Weekly put it on its end-of-the-decade, "best-of" list, saying, "Part Keith Richards rift, part sozzled lounge lizard, Johnny Depp's swizzleshtick pirate was definitely one of the most dazzling characters of the decade." In June 2010, Sparrow was named one of Entertainment Weekly 100 Greatest Characters of the Last 20 Years.

An internet hoax about a reality program on the now-defunct Quibi platform called Jack Sparrow House gained traction in the early 2020s. The program supposedly featured fourteen Jack Sparrow impersonators living in a house together, with them being eliminated if they broke character. The hoax included a detailed Wikipedia article, which was eventually deleted. Snopes said that comedian Rory Strahan-Mauk was behind it, and that a photo claiming to be of the contestants were actually fans attending the Tokyo premiere of Dead Men Tell No Tales.

In other media
 
Jack Sparrow also appears in video games and books spun off the Pirates of the Caribbean media franchise. Jack also appears in the Disney Infinity series, where he is voiced by Jared Butler, and in the Kingdom Hearts series, first in 2005's Kingdom Hearts II, where he is voiced by James Arnold Taylor, and again in 2019's Kingdom Hearts III, reprised by Butler. In the video game Sea of Thieves he is voiced again by Butler. Jack Sparrow also appears as playable character in Disney Magic Kingdoms, where he also has his captain coat as a costume.

Pirates of the Caribbean: The Complete Visual Guide gives a backstory to Sparrow in which he was born on a pirate ship during a typhoon in the Indian Ocean and was trained to fence by an Italian. Books following Sparrow's adventures before the events of the film include a twelve-book series focusing on his teenage years entitled Pirates of the Caribbean: Jack Sparrow, and a five-books Pirates of the Caribbean: Legends of the Brethren Court series. In 2011, Ann C. Crispin wrote a novel titled Pirates of the Caribbean: The Price of Freedom, which follows Jack's adventures as a merchant captain for the East India Trading Company.

In 2011, comedy group the Lonely Island, in collaboration with ballad singer Michael Bolton, released a song named for Jack.

In July 2022, Depp portrayed a parody of Sparrow, Phillip Artoosh, in Adventurer's Game, a promotional short film for the mobile game Sea of Dawn.

Notes

References

External links

 Jack Sparrow on IMDb

Adventure film characters
Disney characters originating in film
Fictional castaways
Film characters introduced in 2003
Fictional English people
Fictional characters who have made pacts with devils
Fictional helmsmen
Fictional outlaws
Fictional sea pirates
Fictional sea captains
Fictional swordfighters in films
Fictional tricksters
Fictional undead
Internet memes introduced in the 2010s
Johnny Depp
Male characters in film
Pirates of the Caribbean characters
Fictional gentleman thieves